The 1st constituency of Lozère (French: Première circonscription de la Lozère) was a French legislative constituency in the Lozère département. It was abolished in the 2010 redistricting of French legislative constituencies, its last deputy was Francis Saint-Léger.
From the 2012 election onwards, the entire department was one constituency.

References

Defunct French legislative constituencies
French legislative constituencies of Lozère
2010 disestablishments in France